Fhumulani Wiseman Kamanga (born 14 November 1991 in Johannesburg, South Africa) is a South African rugby union player, who most recently played provincial rugby with . His regular position is loosehead prop.

Career

Youth / Golden Lions / UJ

Kamanga was selected to a number of  youth sides during his high school years at Hoërskool Marais Viljoen in Alberton; he represented them at the Under-16 Grant Khomo Week tournament in 2007, at the Under-18 Academy Week tournament in 2008 and at the Under-18 Craven Week tournament in 2009.

He joined the Golden Lions' academy in 2010 and played for the  side in the Under-19 Provincial Championship of that year. He was included in a training squad for the South Africa Under-20 squad prior to the 2010 IRB Junior World Championship, but missed out on selection for the final squad.

He was a regular in the  squad that played in the 2012 Under-21 Provincial Championship, starting ten of their twelve matches as they failed to qualify for the semi-finals by finishing in fifth spot.

Kamanga joined university side  for their 2013 Varsity Cup campaign, where he was the first-choice loosehead prop, playing in all eight of their matches as they reached the semi-final of the competition. He also scored a try against fellow Johannesburg-based university side . After the Varsity Cup competition, he made one appearance in the 2013 Vodacom Cup, playing off the bench in their match against  in a 24–11 victory at the UJ Stadium.

Griquas

References

South African rugby union players
Living people
1991 births
Rugby union players from Johannesburg
Rugby union props
Golden Lions players
Griquas (rugby union) players